The 27th Stinkers Bad Movie Awards were released by the Hastings Bad Cinema Society in 2005 to honour the worst films the film industry had to offer in 2004. Alexander received the most nominations with nine. All nominees and winners, with respective percentages of votes for each category, are listed below. Dishonourable mentions are also featured for Worst Picture (64 total).

Winners and nominees

Worst Picture 
{| class="wikitable sortable plainrowheaders" border="1" cellpadding="5" cellspacing="0" align="centre"
! Recipient
! Percentage of Votes
|-
|- style="background:#FAEB86;"
| Catwoman (Warner Bros.)| 34%|-
| Alexander (Warner Bros.)
| 18%
|-
| Superbabies: Baby Geniuses 2 (Sony)
| 12%
|-
| Van Helsing (Universal)
| 15%
|-
| White Chicks (Sony)
| 21%
|-
|}

 Dishonourable Mentions 

 Against the Ropes (Paramount)
 Agent Cody Banks 2: Destination London (MGM)
 The Alamo (Touchstone)
 Alien vs. Predator (FOX)
 Along Came Polly (Universal)
 Anacondas: The Hunt for the Blood Orchid (Sony)
 Around the World in 80 Days (Disney)
 The Big Bounce (Warner Bros.)
 Bridget Jones: The Edge of Reason (Universal)
 The Brown Bunny (Wellspring)
 The Butterfly Effect (New Line)
 Catch That Kid (FOX)
 Christmas with the Kranks (Sony)
 A Cinderella Story (Warner Bros.)
 Closer (Sony)
 The Day After Tomorrow (FOX)
 Dirty Dancing: Havana Nights (Lionsgate)
 The Dreamers (FOX)
 Envy (DreamWorks)
 Eternal Sunshine of the Spotless Mind (Focus)
 Eulogy (Lionsgate)
 Exorcist: The Beginning (Warner Bros.)
 Fahrenheit 9/11 (Lionsgate)
 Fat Albert (FOX)
 50 First Dates (Sony)
 Garfield the Movie (FOX)
 Gold Diggers (MGM)
 Hidalgo (Touchstone)
 Home on the Range (Disney)
 I Heart Huckabees (FOX)
 Jersey Girl (Miramax)
 King Arthur (Touchstone)
 The Ladykillers (Touchstone)
 The Life Aquatic With Steve Zissou (Touchstone)
 Little Black Book (Sony)
 My Baby's Daddy (Miramax)
 New York Minute (Warner Bros.)
 The Passion of the Christ (Icon)
 The Perfect Score (Paramount)
 The Phantom of the Opera (Warner Bros.)
 The Prince and Me (Paramount)
 The Punisher (Lionsgate)
 Raise Your Voice (New Line)
 Raising Helen (Touchstone)
 Scooby-Doo 2: Monsters Unleashed (Warner Bros.)
 Shall We Dance? (Miramax)
 She Hate Me (Sony)
 Sleepover (MGM)
 Soul Plane (MGM)
 Spanglish (Sony)
 Starsky & Hutch (Warner Bros., Dimension)
 The Stepford Wives (Paramount)
 Surviving Christmas (DreamWorks)
 Taxi (FOX)
 Thunderbirds (Universal)
 Torque (Warner Bros.)
 Twisted (Paramount)
 The Village (Touchstone)
 Walking Tall (MGM)
 The Whole Ten Yards (Warner Bros.)
 Wicker Park (MGM)
 Win a Date with Tad Hamilton! (DreamWorks)
 You Got Served (Sony)
 Yu-Gi-Oh! The Movie: Pyramid of Light (Warner Bros.)

 Worst Director 

 Worst Actor 

 Worst Actress 

 Worst Supporting Actor 

 Worst Supporting Actress 

 Worst Screenplay 
{| class="wikitable sortable plainrowheaders" border="1" cellpadding="5" cellspacing="0" align="centre"
! Recipient
! Percentage of Votes
|-
|- style="background:#B0C4DE;"
| Christmas with the Kranks (Sony), written by Chris Columbus| 30%|-
|Alexander (Warner Bros.), written by Christopher Kyle, Oliver Stone, and Laeta Kalogridis; partially based on the 1973 book Alexander the Great
| 28%
|-
|Bridget Jones: The Edge of Reason (Universal), written by Adam Brooks, Richard Curtis, Andrew Davies, and Helen Fielding
| 3%
|-
|Catwoman (Warner Bros.), screenplay by John Brancato, John Brancato, and John Rogers; based on a story by Theresa Rebeck, Brancato, and Ferris
| 21%
|-
|Superbabies: Baby Geniuses 2 (Sony), written by Gregory Poppen
| 18%
|-
|}

 Most Painfully Unfunny Comedy 
{| class="wikitable sortable plainrowheaders" border="1" cellpadding="5" cellspacing="0" align="centre"
! Recipient
! Percentage of Votes
|-
|- style="background:#B0C4DE;"
|White Chicks (Sony)| 41%|-
|Bridget Jones: The Edge of Reason (Universal)
| 7%
|-
|The Cookout (Lionsgate)
| 7%
|-
|Christmas with the Kranks (Sony)
| 30%
|-
|Superbabies: Baby Geniuses 2 (Sony)
| 15%
|-
|}

 Worst Resurrection of a TV Show 
{| class="wikitable sortable plainrowheaders" border="1" cellpadding="5" cellspacing="0" align="centre"
! Recipient
! Percentage of Votes
|-
|- style="background:#B0C4DE;"
|Scooby-Doo 2: Monsters Unleashed (Warner Bros.)| 54%|-
|Fat Albert (FOX)
| 30%
|-
|Starsky & Hutch (Warner Bros., Dimension)
| 19%
|-
|}

 Most Intrusive Musical Score 
{| class="wikitable sortable plainrowheaders" border="1" cellpadding="5" cellspacing="0" align="centre"
! Recipient
! Percentage of Votes
|-
|- style="background:#B0C4DE;"
|Alexander (Warner Bros.)| 42%|-
|Catwoman (Warner Bros.)
| 20%
|-
|Christmas with the Kranks (Sony)
| 15%
|-
|Envy (DreamWorks)
| 10%
|-
|Jersey Girl (Miramax)
| 13%
|-
|}

 Worst Song or Song Performance in a Film or Its End Credits 

 Worst Sequel 
{| class="wikitable sortable plainrowheaders" border="1" cellpadding="5" cellspacing="0" align="centre"
! Recipient
! Percentage of Votes
|-
|- style="background:#B0C4DE;"
|The Whole Ten Yards (Warner Bros.)| 39%'''
|-
|Bridget Jones: The Edge of Reason (Universal)
| 13%
|-
|Dirty Dancing: Havana Nights (Lionsgate)
| 10%
|-
|Scooby Doo 2: Monsters Unleashed (Warner Bros.)
| 8%
|-
|Superbabies: Baby Geniuses 2'' (Sony)
| 30%
|-
|}

 Most Unwelcome Remake 

 Worst On-Screen Couple 

 Most Annoying Fake Accent (Male) 

 Most Annoying Fake Accent (Female) 

 Least "Special" Special Effects 
{| class="wikitable sortable plainrowheaders" border="1" cellpadding="5" cellspacing="0" align="centre"
! Recipient
! Percentage of Votes
|-
|- style="background:#B0C4DE;"
|Catwoman (Warner Bros.)| 37%|-
| Alexander (Warner Bros.)
| 13%
|-
|Scooby Doo 2: Monsters Unleashed (Warner Bros.)
| 11%
|-
|Superbabies: Baby Geniuses 2 (Sony)
| 23%
|-
|White Chicks (Sony)
| 16%
|-
|}

 Worst Christmas Movie 
{| class="wikitable sortable plainrowheaders" border="1" cellpadding="5" cellspacing="0" align="centre"
! Recipient
! Percentage of Votes
|-
|- style="background:#B0C4DE;"
|Christmas with the Kranks (Sony)| 59%'''
|-
|The Polar Express (Warner Bros.)
| 15%
|-
|Surviving Christmas (DreamWorks)
| 26%
|-
|}

 The Spencer Breslin Award (for Worst Performance by a Child in a Feature Role) 
 Soren Fulton in Thunderbirds''

Films with multiple wins and nominations

The following films received multiple nominations:

The following films received multiple wins:

References 

Stinkers Bad Movie Awards
2004 film awards